Hemiplecta humphreysiana is a species of air-breathing land snails, terrestrial pulmonate gastropod mollusks in the family Ariophantidae.

Description
Hemiplecta humphreysiana has a shell reaching a diameter of 33–50 mm. The surface of this shell is yellowish-fulvous or brown and minutely wrinkled.

Distribution
This species is widespread in Malay Peninsula, Borneo and Sumatra.

References
 Bornean Terrestrial Molluscs
Conchology
Encyclopedia of life
Discover Life
WMSD
Biolib

External links

Ariophantidae
Gastropods described in 1841